Fränzi or Franzi is a given name or nickname. Notable people with the name include:
 Fränzi Aufdenblatten, Swiss World Cup alpine ski racer
 Franzi Groszmann, writer
 Fränzi Mägert-Kohli (born 1976), Swiss snowboarder
 Fränzi Schmidt (born 1943), Swiss figure skater
 Franziska van Almsick, swimmer

See also 
 Franziska (disambiguation)